Downton Abbey is a British period drama television series created by Julian Fellowes and co-produced by Carnival Films and Masterpiece. It first aired on ITV in the United Kingdom on 26 September 2010 and on PBS in the United States on 9 January 2011, as part of the Masterpiece Classic anthology. Six series have been made, the sixth airing in the autumn of 2015 in the UK and Ireland and in January 2016 in the United States. On 26 March 2015, the sixth series was confirmed to be the final series, with the final episode airing in the UK on 25 December 2015 on ITV. During the course of the programme, 52 episodes of Downton Abbey aired over six series. Two feature films, Downton Abbey (2019) and Downton Abbey: A New Era (2022), have since been produced.

Series overview

Episodes

Series 1 (2010)

Series 2 (2011)

Series 3 (2012)

Series 4 (2013)

Series 5 (2014)

Series 6 (2015)

Films
Downton Abbey (2019)
Downton Abbey: A New Era (2022)

Notes

References

External links
 

Downton Abbey series

Episodes
Downton Abbey